is a company that offers information about international politics and economy, and does investment consulting based in Minato, Tokyo, Japan. It was established on April 1, 2005. Its company's founder and chairman is Japanese former professor of graduate school at Waseda University, economist Kazuhide Uekusa.

Company's business 
Publication of "Interest, Exchange, Stock prices flash" (Membership system report)
Giving lectures
Planning and administration of lectures, classes about economy, management, and investment 
Investigation about economy, trust of research business 
Publication of books and magazines 
Planning, administration, and enforcement of special events 
Consulting about investments

External links 
Company home page 

Financial services companies of Japan
Research institutes in Japan